Jonne Aaron Liimatainen (born 30 August 1983) is a Finnish singer. He became one of the most prominent teen idols and rock stars in Finland in the 2000s. He is known as the lead vocalist, composer, lyricist, and frontman of the Finnish glam rock band Negative.

In 2012, Aaron took part in the inaugurating series of Vain elämää, the Finnish version of The Best Singers series broadcast on Finnish Nelonen commercial television channel.

Personal life
Jonne Aaron was born in Tampere, and is the brother of Ville Liimatainen, lead vocalist of the Finnish glam rock band Flinch. He dated Star Wreck: In the Pirkinning actress Tiina Routamaa for nine years, but they separated in the summer of 2011.

Discography

Albums
with Negative

Solo

Singles
with Negative

Solo

Featured in

Other charted songs

References

21st-century Finnish male singers
Finnish lyricists
1983 births
Living people
Musicians from Tampere